Juliet Wiscombe Starrett (born April 22, 1973) is a former whitewater rafting world champion, CEO of San Francisco Crossfit, founder of the nonprofit Stand Up Kids, and philanthropist. She is the co-founder, with her husband Kelly Starrett, of the fitness website MobilityWOD.

Early life and education
Juliet Wiscombe was born in Boulder, Colorado, and moved to Long Beach, California, with her family during high school. She attended the University of California, Berkeley, graduating in 1995 with a degree in Environmental Science and Policy & Management.

Athletic and fitness career
In high school, Juliet was the 1989 State Champion in rowing. She went on to row at UC Berkeley. As a sophomore she battled thyroid cancer, but was able to return to rowing and eventually whitewater rafting.  Following college, Starrett won two whitewater rafting world championships and five national titles.  While rafting, she met her future husband, Kelly Starrett, with whom she would later co-found one of the first CrossFit gyms.

After her whitewater career was over, Starrett entered the University of San Francisco School of Law, earning her J.D. in 2003. She passed the State Bar of California in 2003. In 2004, as a corporate lawyer practicing commercial litigation at Reed Smith, she and her husband opened San Francisco Crossfit.  As the gym grew, she eventually quit her legal position to focus on her fitness entrepreneurial career full-time. In 2009, she and her husband started the fitness website MobilityWOD, which has been praised as a top fitness blog by Outside Magazine and other outlets.

Philanthropy and writing
In 2015, Starrett co-founded the nonprofit Stand Up Kids nonprofit to raise money for standing desks for schoolchildren.  The nonprofit has been confronted by doubts from parents and teachers about fatigue and restlessness, but reviews of early implementation by CNN and NBC News were positive.  Remaining concerns about the nonprofit—and standing desks in general—center on the high cost of the desks.

Starrett, her husband, and Glen Cardoza co-authored the Wall Street Journal bestselling book Deskbound in 2016. The book describes the effects of prolonged sitting and a sedentary lifestyle.

Personal life
She and her husband Kelly Starrett have two daughters.

References

1973 births
Living people
Women chief executives
American women lawyers
Whitewater sports people
University of California, Berkeley alumni
University of San Francisco School of Law alumni
Sportspeople from Boulder, Colorado
21st-century American women